Nevada's 3rd Senate district is one of 21 districts in the Nevada Senate. It has  been represented by Democrat Chris Brooks since 2018, when he was appointed to succeed fellow Democrat Tick Segerblom.

Geography and demographics
District 3 is based in Las Vegas, including parts of Downtown Las Vegas, and also covers small sections of Paradise and Spring Valley in Clark County.

The district overlaps with Nevada's 1st and 4th congressional districts, and with the 3rd and 10th districts of the Nevada Assembly. It is the second-smallest Senate district, after the 2nd district. 

According to the 2010 census, the district's population was 128,724 – 0.1% above the ideal. Just under 45% of the inhabitants of the district were Hispanic or Latino. The percentage of Hispanics and Latinos in District 3 was twice as high as the average in Nevada, while the percentage of whites was almost 10% lower than the state average. The median household income amounted to nearly $40,000, which is over $10,000 lower than the median of the state, and the district's poverty rate was 22%.

Recent election results
Nevada Senators are elected to staggered four-year terms; since 2012 redistricting, the 3rd district has held elections in presidential years.

2020

2016
In 2016, incumbent Tick Segerblom faced Republican Dennis Palmerston and Libertarian general contractor Jonathan Friedrich. Segerblom focused on criminal justice reform and recreational marijuana legalization, Friedrich opposed marijuana legalization and criticized homeowner associations, and Palmerston did not actively campaign. Segerblom defeated both opponents with over 60% of the vote.

2012
In 2012, Assemblymember and Democrat Tick Segerblom faced veteran and Republican Ed Gobel. Segerblom focused on criminal justice issues, raising corporate taxes, and raising the gasoline tax, while Gobel argued that taxes should not be raised. Segerblom won the election with nearly 65% of the vote.

Federal and statewide results in District 3

History 
The 3rd district was created when the districts were reapportioned after the 2010 Census. The new districts came into effect on January 1, 2012 for filing for office, and for nominating and electing senators, and for all other purposes on November 7  – the day after Election Day, when the new terms began. The borders of District 3 are defined in the Nevada Revised Statutes using census tracts, block groups, and blocks.

References

External links 
 
 

3
Clark County, Nevada